Leif is a studio album by Swedish comedy and revue group Galenskaparna och After Shave. It was released in 1987 on cassette, LP and CD, and contains the original music from the film with the same name.

Track listing 

Arrangement: Charles Falk (1–13), Anders Widestrand (2, 9, 10), Den ofattbara orkestern (7)

Personnel

Musicians 

 Den ofattbara orkestern (3, 4, 5, 6, 8, 13):
 Charles Falk – Keyboard, vocals
 Jan Gunér – Bas, lead vocals (4), vocals
 Lars Moberg – Guitar, vocals
 Lars Berndtsson – Vocals
 Måns Abrahamsson – Drums, vocals
 Andreas Bergman – Bass
 Rotums musikkår (2, 9, 10):
 Sven Fridolfsson – Saxophone (6, 13)
 Magnus Johansson – Trumpet (8)
 Gene De Vaughn – Trumpet (8)
 Ralph Soovik – Trombone (8)
 Imre Daun – Drums (8)
 Rotumkvartetten (3, 5, 9, 12):
 Bertil Lindh – Violin 
 Thord Svedlund – Violin
 Urban Ward – Cello
 Bo Olsson – Viola
 Others:
 Musicians from Göteborgs Symfoniorkester (1, 6, 12, 13)
 Children's Choir from Brunnsboskolan, Göteborg (conductor: Anne Johansson) (9)
 Children's Choir from Lillegårdsskolan och Ugglumsskola, Partille (dir: Otto Gunér) (9)
 Singers from Orphei Drängar (1, 9)

Production 
 Charles Falk, Claes Eriksson – producers
 Rolf Allan Håkansson – cover designer
 Lars "Dille" Diedricson, Åke Linton, Bernard Löhr – technicians
 Jan Ugand, Rune Persson – technicians
 AB Svensk Filmindustri and AB Kulturtuben / Gala-vax – disc production
 Grammofon AB Electra – distribution

See also 
 Leif, film with the same name

1987 albums
Film scores
Swedish-language albums
Galenskaparna och After Shave